SHINE is a nationwide festival in Singapore "by youth, for youth' and is jointly supported by the Ministry of Social and Family Development  and the National Youth Council.

Inaugurated in 2005,  SHINE aims to:
Showcase and develop youth talent and skills
Facilitate and profile youth community contribution
Project a positive youth image and profile young role models

Youths aged 15–35 could sign up as participants, SHINE volunteers or realize their ideas through grants. Over 200,000 youth were part of SHINE 2007's wide assortment of activities.

SHINE 2008 was scheduled be held from 28 June to 2 August.

References

Festivals in Singapore
Youth festivals